Rachid Berouas is a Moroccan footballer who plays as midfielder for KAC Kenitra in the Moroccan Premier League.

Berouas was part of the KAC Kenitra side that gained promotion by winning the GNF-2 title during the 2001–02 season.

References

Profile at KAC Fan Club

Moroccan footballers
1977 births
Living people
People from Kenitra
Association football midfielders
KAC Kénitra players